Iosi Havilio (born 1974 in Buenos Aires) is an Argentine author. He's the son of Yugoslav-Argentine actor Harry Havilio.

Life and career
His first novel, Open Door was published in Buenos Aires in 2006. The novel tells the story of a young woman that, after losing her job in Buenos Aires, finds herself drifting towards a very different pace of life in the countryside. Open Door was highly praised by influential writers and critics like Rodolfo Fogwill and Beatriz Sarlo. Sarlo commented : ‘Open Door really surprised me, it doesn’t obey any of the laws of reading, it feels like it sprang out of nowhere.’. In 2009, Open Door was published in Spain by Caballo de Troya.

In 2011, Open Door was translated into English by Beth Fowler and published in the United Kingdom by the And Other Stories.

Havilio took part in the anthology Buenos Aires/Escala 1:1 (Entropía, 2008) and the Spanish edition of La Joven Guardia (Belacqua, 2009). IN 2010, Havilio published his second work, Estocolmo. The main character of Estocolmo is a gay Chilean man returning to his home country from 30 years of exile in Sweden after the 1973 coup d'état.

And Other Stories published the English translation of Havilio's third novel, Paradises, in 2013 and his fifth, Petite Fleur, in 2017.

Work  
 
 Opendoor (Entropía, 2006).  
 Estocolmo (Random House Mondadori, 2010).  
 Paraísos (Random House Mondadori, 2012).  
 La serenidad (Entropía, 2014).  
 Pequeña Flor (Random House Mondadori, 2015).  
 Jacki, la internet profunda (Socios Fundadores, 2018).  
 Vuelta y vuelta (Random House Mondadori, 2019).

Work in translation 

 Open Door English trans. Beth Fowler (London: And Other Stories, 2011). 
 Paradises English trans. Beth Fowler (London: And Other Stories, 2013). .
 Opendoor Italian trans. Barca Vincenzo (Roma: Caravan Edizioni, 2015). . 
 Petite Fleur English trans. Lorna Scott Fox (London: And Other Stories, 2017). .
 Petite fleur (jamais ne meurt) French trans. Margot Nguyen-Béraud (Editions Denoël, 2017). .

References

External links
 Iosi Havilio in And Other Stories
 Blog about Estocolmo (in Spanish)

Living people
1974 births
Argentine male novelists
Writers from Buenos Aires
Argentine people of Serbian descent
21st-century male writers
21st-century Argentine novelists